Freising is an electoral constituency (German: Wahlkreis) represented in the Bundestag. It elects one member via first-past-the-post voting. Under the current constituency numbering system, it is designated as constituency 214. It is located in southern Bavaria, comprising the districts of Freising, Pfaffenhofen, the southern part of the Neuburg-Schrobenhausen district.

Freising was created for the 1976 federal election. Since 2013, it has been represented by Erich Irlstorfer of the Christian Social Union (CSU).

Geography
Freising is located in southern Bavaria. As of the 2021 federal election, it comprises the districts of Freising and Pfaffenhofen as well as the municipalities of Aresing, Berg im Gau, Brunnen, Gachenbach, Langenmosen, Schrobenhausen, and Waidhofen from the district of Neuburg-Schrobenhausen.

History
Freising was created in 1976. In the 1976 election, it was constituency 201 in the numbering system. In the 1980 through 1998 elections, it was number 200. In the 2002 and 2005 elections, it was number 216. In the 2009 and 2013 elections, it was number 215. Since the 2017 election, it has been number 214.

Originally, the constituency comprised the districts of Freising and Pfaffenhofen and the municipalities of Aschheim, Dornach, Feldkirchen, Garching bei München, Grasbrunn, Haar, Harthausen, Heimstetten, Hohenbrunn, Ismaning, Kirchheim bei München, Oberschleißheim, Putzbrunn, Unterföhring, and Unterschleißheim from the Landkreis München district. In the 1980 through 1994 elections, it comprised the districts of Freising, Pfaffenhofen, and Erding. In the 1998 election, it comprised the districts of Freising and Pfaffenhofen and, from the Erding district, the municipalities of Bockhorn, Dorfen, Erding, Fraunberg, Isen, Lengdorf, Sankt Wolfgang, and Taufkirchen and the Verwaltungsgemeinschaften of Steinkirchen and Wartenberg. In the 2002 election, it lost the municipalities of Isen, Lengdorf, Sankt Wolfgang from the Erding district. In the 2005 and 2009 elections, it comprised only the districts of Freising and Pfaffenhofen. In the 2013 election, it gained the municipality of Petershausen from the Dachau district and the municipality of Aresing from the Neuburg-Schrobenhausen district. It acquired its current borders in the 2017 election.

Members
The constituency has been held continuously by the Christian Social Union (CSU) since its creation. It was first represented by Albert Probst from 1976 to 1998. He was succeeded by Franz Obermeier from 1998 to 2013. Erich Irlstorfer was elected in 2013, and re-elected in 2017 and 2021.

Election results

2021 election

2017 election

2013 election

2009 election

References

Federal electoral districts in Bavaria
1976 establishments in West Germany
Constituencies established in 1976
Freising (district)
Pfaffenhofen (district)
Neuburg-Schrobenhausen